Carver may refer to:

Places

United States
 Carver, Massachusetts, a town
 Carver County, Minnesota
 Carver, Minnesota, a city
 Carver, Oregon, an unincorporated community
 Carver, Richmond, Virginia, a neighborhood
 Carver, West Virginia, an unincorporated community
 Carver Glacier, Oregon
 Carver Lake (Washington County, Minnesota)
 Carver Lake, Oregon, northeast of Prouty Glacier
 Carver Creek (disambiguation)
 Carver Branch, a stream in Missouri

Elsewhere
 Carver Lake (Ontario), Canada - see List of lakes of Ontario: C
 Carver (crater), on the Moon

Arts and entertainment
 Carver (film), a 2008 horror film directed by Franklin Guerrero, Jr.
 Carver (novel), the fifth novel of the Samuel Carver series by Tom Cain
 Carver (play), a radio drama by the Scottish composer and writer John Purser
 Carver (Nip/Tuck), a serial rapist/killer in the TV series Nip/Tuck
 Carver: A Life in Poems, a 1987 poetry collection by Marilyn Nelson

Businesses
 Carver Federal Savings Bank, the largest black-owned financial institution in the United States
 Carver Bancorp, Inc., the holding company for Carver Federal Savings Bank
 Carver State Bank, established in 1927, based and operating in Georgia
 Carver Savings and Loan Association, the first African-American financial institution in Omaha, Nebraska
 Carver Yachts, a powerboat company in Pulaski, Wisconsin
 Bob Carver LLC, formerly the Carver Corporation, a manufacturer of audio equipment
 The Hotel Carver, a former hotel, the first African American-owned hotel in Pasadena, California
 Carver Theater (disambiguation)
 Carver (automotive company), a Dutch manufacturer of tilting three-wheeled vehicles

American schools
 Carver College, a private Bible college in Atlanta, Georgia
 Carver Junior College, Cocoa, Florida, closed in 1963
 Carver High School (disambiguation)
 Carver Center for Arts and Technology, a public high school in Towson, Maryland
 Carver Military Academy, Chicago, Illinois, a public military high school
 Carver Middle School (disambiguation)
 Carver Academy, a public charter school in San Antonio, Texas
 Carver Elementary School (disambiguation)

People
 Carver (surname)
 Carver Dana Andrews (1909-1992), American actor
 Carver Mead (born 1934), American computer scientist
 Carver Shannon (born 1938), American National Football League and Canadian Football League former player

Other uses
 Carver chair
 CARVER matrix, a target prioritization method
 Carver Hall, an Iowa State University academic building
 Carver Memorial Library, the public library of Searsport, Maine
 Carver Arena, a sports facility in Peoria, Illinois
 Carver Barracks, a British Army base in Essex, England
 Carver Houses, a public housing development in Manhattan
 Atlas Carver, a replacement for the South African Air Force's Mirage III, canceled in 1991
 Trekking Carver, a French paraglider design

See also
 Carvers, Nevada, United States, an unincorporated community
 Carving (disambiguation)